Aria Express (formerly and also known as the CityCenter Tram) is a  people mover located on the Las Vegas Strip.

The system's 3 stations connect the Las Vegas casinos Park MGM and Bellagio with CityCenter Las Vegas. The Park MGM station additionally serves the Aria Resort and Casino. The CityCenter station is located above The Shops at Crystals, and also serves other CityCenter properties such as Aria and Waldorf Astoria Las Vegas. The northern Bellagio station also serves the Vdara. All of the properties served by the Aria Express are operated or were developed by MGM Resorts International.

The Aria Express is free to ride and operates daily from 8:00 am until 2:00 am.

Technical 

Like the related Mandalay Bay Tram, the system was built by Doppelmayr Cable Car using the Cable Liner technology. It opened to the public in December 2009.

Each of the two trains consist of 4 cars with a capacity of 33 people, for a total capacity of 132 people per train. It is able to move 3300 passengers per hour per direction.

See also 

 Las Vegas Monorail
 Mirage-Treasure Island Tram

References 

Transportation in Las Vegas
Las Vegas Strip
Cable railways in the United States
Cable Liner people movers
Railway lines opened in 2009
Passenger rail transportation in Nevada